St Andrew's Roundhay is in Shaftesbury Avenue, Roundhay, Leeds, West Yorkshire, England. It is an active United Reformed Church in Leeds. The church and Sunday school is recorded in the National Heritage List for England as a designated Grade II listed building.

History
St Andrew's Roundhay was built as Roundhay Congregational Church and designed by the architect W H Beevers in Gothic Revival style. The foundation stone of the first School Church was laid in November 1901. The Church was formally constituted in February 1902 with 29 members. The foundation stone of the present church was laid in 1907  and the church was opened in 1908.

In 1972 the church became St Andrew's Roundhay United Reformed Church.

Architecture
The church is constructed in rock-faced gritstone and has a red tile roof. The three-stage tower is tall but slim. The Sunday school is attached to the north end of the church. The church has a 5-bay nave with open timber roof and wooden panelling. The east window is illustrating the parable of the Good Samaritan and dated 1907.

International relations
St Andrew's Roundhay has a partnership with the Lutherkirche in Frankenthal, Rhineland-Palatinate and the Martinskirche in Bernburg, Saxony-Anhalt, Germany.

References

External links

 St Andrew's Roundhay (Website)

United Reformed churches in England
Grade II listed churches in West Yorkshire
Gothic Revival church buildings in England
Gothic Revival architecture in West Yorkshire
Churches completed in 1908
Churches in Leeds